Yentl Van Genechten (born 18 August 2000) is a Belgian professional footballer who plays as a right-back for Belgian Pro League club Eupen.

Club career
Van Genechten is a youth product of Heist, Mechelen, and Westerlo. He signed his first professional contract with Westerlo on 13 March 2018. He had a season-long loan with Thes Sport in the 2019–20 season. He then transferred to Lierse Kempenzonen on 17 April 2020. The following season he joined the Genk U21s on 10 July 2021. On 28 June 2022, he transferred to the Belgian Pro League club Eupen until 2025.

References

External links

Pro League profile

2000 births
Living people
People from Heist-op-den-Berg
Belgian footballers
Association football fullbacks
K.V.C. Westerlo players
K.V.V. Thes Sport Tessenderlo players
Lierse Kempenzonen players
K.R.C. Genk players
K.A.S. Eupen players
Belgian Pro League players
Challenger Pro League players
Belgian Third Division players